Londonderry Mall is a shopping centre located in north Edmonton, Alberta, Canada. It contains over 150 stores and services with nine major tenants. The mall opened in 1972 and has been expanded and renovated since. 

Londonderry Mall has many notable stores, including a full service Shoppers Drug Mart, Hudson's Bay, Winners, Dollar Tree, Dollarama, Miniso, Fabricland, Fit 4 Less, Simons department store, Flight Centre and H&M.

The mall recently went under a complete renovation which completed in August 2017.

History

Londonderry Mall opened in 1972 with 85 stores and services. When it opened, it was the largest two-floor enclosed shopping centre in western Canada. Original tenants included The Bay (which still occupies the same location), Eaton's, Woolco, and a movie theatre. Later, it would expand to include Safeway.

The mall underwent its first major expansion in late 1979, then again in the later 1980s. The mall added a wing to the west, and then to the south, which included Eatons new location, and the Edmonton Public Library. The mall expanded to 150 stores and services.

A renovation was completed in 1990 which saw the opening of a new food court in the center of the mall. In the late 1990s, Eatons closed. Save-On-Foods promptly moved into the former Eaton's space on the lower level and Winners on the upper level. 

In late 2013, the relocation and closing of many major tenants and small stores left the mall with many unoccupied spaces. 

In late 2014, the mall announced a complete mall renovation and remerchandising project. Army & Navy and Sport Chek Supercentre had moved out of the mall to make way for a newly announced Simons store. Winners re-located to an unused space, which made way for re-location of the food court to the former Winners space. Fabricland remained in the former Winners space while Dollarama re-located to the new food court from a neighbouring space where Sport Chek was formerly located to make way for H&M.

Save-On-Foods closed in 2022, because of the mall owners struggling to keep the store in business due to an expensive rental. No Frills will take the former location of Save-On-Foods in summer of 2023.

On February 1st, 2023, Hudson's Bay announced that they will close their location at the mall in August of that same year.

Renovation
In September 2014, Londonderry Mall publicly announced a renovation and remerchandising project. The renovation completely changed the face of the mall, including all new entrances, lighting, escalators, elevators, along with the relocation of many stores and the food court.  The renovation was designed by MMC Architects and GH+A Design and was completed in August 2017.

The demolition of the mall was complete by mid-2015, which included the removal of all elevators, escalators, water fountains and plant-beds. The first phase of the renovation was complete in June 2016, which included the relocation of the food court and the renovation of the mall common areas. The second phase of the renovation completed in August 2017, in which the new Simons store opened to the public, along with much smaller local Alberta based stores.

Gallery

References

External links
 

Shopping malls in Edmonton
Shopping malls established in 1972
Tourist attractions in Edmonton